Vladislav Vadimovich Lazarev (born 13 November 2001) is a Russian football player who plays for FC Baltika Kaliningrad.

Club career
He made his debut in the Russian Football National League for FC Baltika Kaliningrad on 24 October 2020 in a game against FC Irtysh Omsk.

References

External links
 
 Profile by Russian Football National League

2001 births
Sportspeople from Kaliningrad
Living people
Russian footballers
Association football midfielders
FC Baltika Kaliningrad players
Russian First League players
Russian Second League players